Sarpara is a village in Kamrup rural district, situated in south bank of river Brahmaputra.

Transport
The village is near National Highway 17 . Near Train station and connected to nearby towns and cities with regular buses and other modes of transportation.

See also
 Titkuri	
 Tukrapara

References

Villages in Kamrup district